In Israel, basketball is a popular sport, with a multi-tiered professional club league system, as well as men's and women's national teams.

Professional league structure

Israeli Basketball Premier League
Ligat HaAl  or the Israeli Premier League, is the top tier level league of basketball competition in Israel, making it Israel's primary basketball competition. Ligat HaAl comprises the top twelve basketball clubs, and was founded in 1954.

Liga Leumit
Liga Leumit is the second tier level league of basketball competition.

The league contains 14 clubs that compete in a home-and-away round-robin. At the end of the season, the top eight clubs advance to the play-offs. The first round is played on a best-of-three basis. The four winning clubs advance to two best-of-five playoffs, the winners of which are promoted to the Super League. The two teams that finish at the bottom of the table are relegated to Liga Artzit.

Liga Artzit
Liga Artzit is the third tier level league of basketball competition. The league contains 24 clubs (in two districts of 12 teams each one), which compete in a home-and-away round-robin. At the end of the season, the first team from each district (South/North) is promoted to the Liga Leumit. The two teams that finish at the bottom of the table are relegated to Liga Alef.

Liga Alef
Liga Alef is the fourth tier in Israeli Basketball.

Liga Bet
Liga Bet is the fifth and lowest level tier in Israeli Basketball.

State Cups

Israeli Basketball State Cup
The Israeli Basketball State Cup is the second most important basketball competition in Israel, after Ligat HaAl.
The tournament began in 1956, and is run by the IBA. The tournament format consists rounds each consisting of one game elimination matches.

Maccabi Tel Aviv has won the most tournaments, having won 45, last winning the contest in the 2020–21 season.

Israeli Basketball National League Cup
The tournament cup for teams from the second division. tournament held since 2021.

Israeli Basketball League Cup
The Israeli Basketball League Cup is a pre-season basketball tournament held since 2006. It is held the week before the Ligat HaAl season.

Men's team title holders

Israel national basketball teams
The combined Men's and Women's basket team is ranked 55th in the world, and 23rd in the Europe.

Men's
The Israel national basketball team is a men's basketball team that represents Israel in international competitions.

The Israeli team has participated 28 times in the European championship tournament. Their best achievements were a silver medal in 1979, and 5th place in 1953 and 1977. Israel is currently ranked 37th in the world by FIBA, and 14th in Europe (July 2014). Israel will also be the host nation of the competition in 2017.

Women's
The Israel women's national basketball team is a women's basketball team that represents Israel in international competitions.

The women's team is ranked 36th in the world, and 16th in Europe. (July 2014)

They have competed in the EuroBasket Women's tournament 6 times, but have won no metals. Their highest ever finish was 8th place in 1991.

All-time participation table 
Combined table of men's and women's basketball teams, both senior and youth teams.
Not included two discontinued competitions: Men's U-21 World Championship (three participations in four editions) and Women's U-21 World Championship for Women (one participation in two editions). Not included either, Mediterranean Games.

Arenas
There are Seven main and Big basketball arenas in Israel which are:
Ashkelon Sports Arena
Conch Arena
Drive in Arena
Holon Toto Hall
Menora Mivtachim Arena
Pais Arena Jerusalem
Romema Arena

Israel Basketball Association
The IBA is the official governing body of basketball in Israel.  The organization oversees every aspect of the sport including: 
Team and player registration,
League rules,
Issuing league schedules
Certifying match results
Referees and Statisticians certification, and 
The National team.

The IBA also handles associating with international bodies such as FIBA and Euroleague Basketball (company) (who organizes the Euroleague).

NBA connections

Amare Stoudemire
Amare Stoudemire, from the National Basketball Association, best known for his time with the Phoenix Suns and New York Knicks, in the summer of 2013, became a major shareholder of Hapoel Jerusalem Basketball Club together with sports agent Arn Tellem and Ori Allon. The team moved into its new home, the Jerusalem Arena, in August 2014. Stoudemire, in the summer of 2014 was scheduled to conduct his first camp in Israel, in Tel Aviv. Due to Operation Protective Edge he canceled the camp on 14 July. He ended up playing for Jerusalem and Maccabi Tel Aviv.

NBA/WNBA players from Israel

Omri Casspi played for seven different teams over a ten-year NBA career. He was drafted 23rd overall in the 2009 NBA draft, making him the first Israeli to be selected in the first round of an NBA draft.

Gal Mekel, returned to Israel in 2016 after previously playing for the Dallas Mavericks and New Orleans Pelicans. He previously played college basketball for two years at Wichita State.

Shay Doron, in 2007 played for the New York Liberty.

See also
 Sport in Israel
 Baseball in Israel
 Ice hockey in Israel
 American Football in Israel

References